may refer to:

People
 Arakawa (surname)

Geography
 Places
 Arakawa, Tokyo
 Tokyo Sakura Tram (Arakawa Line), a streetcar system
 Arakawa, Niigata
 Arakawa, Saitama

 Rivers
 Arakawa River (Kanto), which flows from Saitama Prefecture and through Tokyo
 Arakawa River (Fukushima), which starts and ends in Fukushima City, Fukushima
 Arakawa River (Uetsu), which flows from Yamagata Prefecture to Niigata Prefecture in northern Japan

See also
 Arakawa's syndrome I
 Arakawa's syndrome II
 Arakawa Under the Bridge